Sebastian Benedict Granfon Arumpac (born August 22, 2012 in General Santos, South Cotabato, Philippines) also known by his nicknames Baste Granfon and Bae-by Baste, is a Filipino child actor, television host, and singer. He is the youngest host in the present roster of presenters of the longest-running noontime variety show Eat Bulaga!.

Career
He first appeared in Kapuso Mo, Jessica Soho on July 19, 2015 as one of the featured segments of the news magazine television show.

He was one of the audience members of The Ryzza Mae Show when Ryzza Mae took a selfie with him, Ryzza also eventually discovered him to become a new star during Ryzza's former TV talk show.  Now he is a co-host of the longest-running noontime variety show in the Philippines, Eat Bulaga!

On August 19, 2017 during his 5th birthday celebration on Eat Bulaga!, Vic Sotto announced that Baste will be dubbed as the new "Youngest recording artist" of the country because he will be having his own dance single entitled "Bastelicious", which he performed live on Eat Bulaga!

Filmography

Television

Film

Discography

Awards

See also
 Alden Richards
 AlDub
 Maine Mendoza

References

External links 

 

2012 births
Living people
Filipino Internet celebrities
Filipino male child actors
Filipino male television actors
People from General Santos
People from Mindanao
People from South Cotabato
Visayan people
GMA Network personalities
Filipino television variety show hosts